Blacktown Girls High School (abbreviated as BGHS) is a government-funded single-sex academically partially selective secondary day school for girls, located in Blacktown, a suburb of western Sydney, New South Wales, Australia. 

Established in 1956 as the co-educational Blacktown High School, the school enrolled approximately 750 students in 2018, from Year 7 to Year 12, of whom three percent identified as Indigenous Australians and 85 percent were from a language background other than English. The school is operated by the NSW Department of Education in accordance with a curriculum developed by the New South Wales Education Standards Authority.

The school's brother school is Blacktown Boys High School.

History

The school was originally established in January 1956 as Blacktown High School. However, owing to a growing local population and in accordance with government policy, it was decided that the schools would be split into two single sex schools: Blacktown Boys and Blacktown Girls High Schools. Both were fully split by 1959.

The school also has 4 house groups. Oodgeroo, Chisholm, Reibey and Fraser; named after prominent women in Australian history.

Notable alumni 

 Nikita Ridgeway - tattoo artist and graphic designer
 Toni Collette - Actress

See also 

 List of government schools in New South Wales
 List of girls' schools in New South Wales
 List of selective high schools in New South Wales
 Education in Australia

References

External links 
 

Blacktown
Public high schools in Sydney
Educational institutions established in 1959
1959 establishments in Australia
Selective schools in New South Wales
Girls' schools in New South Wales